Jiří Baumruk (27 June 1930 – 23 November 1989) was a Czech professional basketball player and coach.

Club career
Baumruk spent his club career playing with Slavia Prague (1952–1953), and namely with Sparta Prague (1950–1951, 1954–1964). With Sparta Prague, he earned nine medals in the Czechoslovak Basketball League (once champion, five times vice-champion, three times 3rd place). In the 1960–61 season, he and his team participated in the FIBA European Champions Cup (now called EuroLeague), and reached the quarterfinals.

National team career
Baumruk represented the senior Czechoslovak national team at the 1960 Pre-Olympic basketball tournament (scoring 68 points in 5 games), and a further two times in the Summer Olympic Games 1952 (4 points in 2 games), 1960 (147 points in 8 games), and in six EuroBaskets, being the MVP of the EuroBasket 1957. 

With the national team, he won three silver medals at EuroBasket, in France 1951, Hungary 1955, and Turkey 1959; and a bronze medal at the EuroBasket in Bulgaria 1957. In 1960, with the national team, he finished in fifth place at the 1960 Summer Olympic Games, and he was the team's leading scorer, with an average of 18.4 points per game.

See also 
 Czechoslovakia national basketball team
 List of the best czech basketball players of the 20th century: Jiří Baumruk (#7)
 Basketball at the 1952 Summer Olympics
 Basketball at the 1960 Summer Olympics
 FIBA EuroBasket MVP
 Sparta Prague

References

External links
 Baumruk, FIBA profile
 Baumruk, OG 1960, FIBA profile
 FIBA Europe profile
 BC Sparta Prague Club history
 Sparta Prague in Division 1 Men 

1930 births
1989 deaths
Basketball players at the 1952 Summer Olympics
Basketball players at the 1960 Summer Olympics
Czech basketball coaches
Czech men's basketball players
Czechoslovak basketball coaches
Czechoslovak men's basketball players
FIBA EuroBasket-winning players
Olympic basketball players of Czechoslovakia
Small forwards
USK Praha players